The LI Special Brigade was an infantry brigade of the Royal Italian Army during World War II. The brigade was formed on 1 February 1942 in Bari and arrived on 1 March 1942 on the island of Crete. The brigade was assigned to the 51st Infantry Division "Siena", which commanded the Italian contingent of the German-Italian Fortress Crete Command during the Axis occupation of Greece.

After the Armistice of Cassibile was announced on 8 September 1943 the brigade surrendered to the Germans.

Organization 
 LI Special Brigade
 265th Infantry Regiment "Lecce"
 Command Company
 3x Fusiliers battalions (III Battalion transferred to the 309th Infantry Regiment "Regina", 50th Infantry Division "Regina" on 15 May 1942)
 341st Infantry Regiment "Modena" (from the 37th Infantry Division "Modena", joined the brigade on 15 May 1942)
 Command Company
 3x Fusiliers battalions
 Support Weapons Company (47/32 anti-tank guns)
 XIV Guardia di Finanza Battalion
 XI Machine Gun Battalion
 XI Mortar Battalion (81mm Mod. 35 mortars; detached from the 11th Infantry Division "Brennero"
 IV Coastal Artillery Group
 VIII Coastal Artillery Group
 XXXVIII Coastal Artillery Group
 LVII Coastal Artillery Group
 CXI Coastal Artillery Group
 XXIX Engineer Battalion
 XLII Engineer Workers Battalion
 51st Tank Company (L6/40 tanks)
 251st Anti-tank Company (47/32 anti-tank guns; detached to the 51st Infantry Division "Siena" from 1 December 1942)
 252nd Anti-tank Company (47/32 anti-tank guns)
 199th Anti-aircraft Battery (20/65 Mod. 35 anti-aircraft guns; detached to the 51st Infantry Division "Siena" from 1 December 1942)
 268th Anti-aircraft Battery (20/65 Mod. 35 anti-aircraft guns)
 269th Anti-aircraft Battery (20/65 Mod. 35 anti-aircraft guns)
 160th Telegraph and Radio Operators Company

Commanding officers 
The division's commanding officer was:

 Generale di Brigata Luigi Chatrian (1 February 1942 - 21 March 1943)
 Generale di Brigata Mario Matteucci (22 March 1943 - 9 September 1943)

References 

Brigades of Italy in World War II
Military units and formations of Italy in Greece in World War II
Military units and formations established in 1942
Military units and formations disestablished in 1943
Lasithi
Crete in World War II